Vaashi is a 2022 Indian Malayalam-language courtroom drama film written and directed by Vishnu G. Raghav and produced by G Suresh Kumar and co-produced by Menaka Suresh and Revathy Suresh. The film stars Tovino Thomas and Keerthy Suresh in the lead roles and has music composed by Kailas Menon.

The film released theatrically on 17 June 2022.

Synopsis
Adv. Ebin and Adv. Madhavi are colleagues who fall in love. However, they find themselves on opposite sides of an IPC 375 case that also involves elements of IPC 417. Despite their personal feelings, they both fight the case with the intention of winning, which causes problems in their personal lives.

Their mentor and friend, Adv. Mulloor, reminds them not to mix personal and professional lives, and eventually, they take his advice and reconcile with each other. Unfortunately, Adv. Madhavi's side loses the case, and the victim experiences a form of Stockholm syndrome.

Both Adv. Ebin and Adv. Madhavi struggle to accept the moral boundaries of their profession, but they decide to keep their professional and personal lives separate. They come to realize that their love is beyond the egos of the courtroom.

Cast

Production
Principal photography began on 17 November 2021 and filming was wrapped up on 19 January  2022.

Release

Theatrical
The film was released in theatres on June 17, 2022.

Home media
The film started streaming on Netflix from 17 July 2022 in Malayalam and dubbed versions of Tamil, Telugu and Kannada languages.

Music
Soundtrack of Vaashi is composed by Kailas Menon and lyrics by Vinayak Sasikumar. The music rights of the film are owned by Think Music.

Track list

References

External links
 

2020s Malayalam-language films
2022 films
Indian courtroom films
Indian legal drama films